Dag Alvar Strömbäck (13 August 1900 – 1 December 1978) was a Swedish philologist and ethnologist who was a professor at Uppsala University and a specialist in Old Norse studies.

Biography
Dag Strömbäck was born in Järbo församling, Sweden on 13 August 1900. He completed his studentexamen at Norra Latin in Stockholm, and subsequently studied at Uppsala University. At Uppsala, Strömbäck completed his B.A. in 1921, and his Ph.D. in 1935. Since 1941 he was a docent in Nordic languages at Uppsala. He also a docent in Icelandic philology at Lund University since 1935, and a visiting professor at the University of Chicago from 1937 to 1939. From 1940 to 1967 he was a senior official at the Institutet för språk och folkminnen. From 1948 to 1967, Strömbäck was Professor of Nordic and Comparative Ethnology at Uppsala University.

Strömbäck specialized in the study of Old Norse literature from a philological and ethnological perspective. He was a member of the Royal Gustavus Adolphus Academy and the Royal Swedish Academy of Letters, History and Antiquities.

Strömbäck retired from Uppsala University in 1977. He died in Helga Trefaldighets församling, Sweden on 1 December 1978.

Selected works
 Sejd, 1935
 Leading Folklorists of the North, 1971
 The Conversion of Iceland, 1975

See also
 Lily Weiser-Aall
 Otto Höfler
 Neil Price (archaeologist)

Sources

 Bo Almqvist: Dag Alvar Strömbäck i Svenskt biografiskt lexikon

1900 births
1978 deaths
Folklorists
Germanic studies scholars
Members of the Royal Gustavus Adolphus Academy
Old Norse studies scholars
Swedish ethnologists
Swedish philologists
Uppsala University alumni
Academic staff of Uppsala University
Writers on Germanic paganism
20th-century philologists